The 1960 New York Titans season was the inaugural season for the team in the upstart American Football League (AFL). The team began play in the Polo Grounds, the one-time home of the National Football League (NFL)'s New York Giants. The Titans finished their first season at a respectable 7–7.

Roster

Schedule

Season summary

Week 1 vs Bills

Week 6 at Bills

Standings

External links 
 1960 Titans statistics

New York Jets seasons
New York Titans
New York Titans season
1960s in Manhattan
Washington Heights, Manhattan